Sword Art Online: Alicization is the third season of the anime series adapted from the light novel series  Sword Art Online, written by Reki Kawahara and illustrated by abec. It is animated by A-1 Pictures and directed by Manabu Ono. It covers the first part of the "Alicization" arc and adapts from the novel's ninth volume, Alicization Beginning, to the fourteenth volume, Alicization Uniting. The second part of the anime, titled Sword Art Online: Alicization – War of Underworld, adapts from the novel's fifteenth volume, Alicization Invading, to the eighteenth volume, Alicization Lasting. While not covered in the light novels, Alicization takes place after Sword Art Online The Movie: Ordinal Scale, as it incorporates elements from the film not found in the novels.

The first part of the series premiered on October 7, 2018, and aired until March 31, 2019, with a one-hour world premiere airing in Japan, the United States, Mexico, Australia, France, Germany, Russia, and South Korea on September 15, 2018. The second part of the series premiered on October 13 and aired until December 29, 2019, with a recap episode summarizing the first part airing on October 6, 2019. The second half of the War of Underworld series was originally scheduled to premiere on April 26, 2020, but was delayed to air from July 12 to September 20, 2020, due to the COVID-19 pandemic. Aniplex of America's English-dubbed version aired on Adult Swim's Toonami programming block from February 10 until July 14, 2019, while the first cour of the second part of the series aired from January 19 until April 5, 2020. The second cour of the second part of the series premiered on Toonami on November 8, 2020. The series is available with multilingual subtitles on iQIYI in South East Asia.



Music 
The second opening theme is "Resister" by Asca, and the second ending theme is "Forget-me-not" by ReoNa, with episode 19 featuring , also sung by ReoNa. In Sword Art Online: Alicization – War of Underworld, the first opening theme is "Resolution" by Haruka Tomatsu, and the first ending theme is "Unlasting" by LiSA. The second opening theme is "Anima" by ReoNa, and the second ending theme is "I will" by Eir Aoi. The series' music is composed by Yuki Kajiura.

Episode list

Sword Art Online: Alicization (2018–19)

Sword Art Online: Alicization – War of Underworld (2019–20)

Media release

Japanese release

Sword Art Online: Alicization

Sword Art Online: Alicization – War of Underworld

Notes

References

External links 
  
 
 
 

Anime postponed due to the COVID-19 pandemic
2018 Japanese television seasons
2019 Japanese television seasons
2020 Japanese television seasons
Alicization
Sword Art Online episode lists